The 2023 Grand Prix La Marseillaise was the 44th edition of the Grand Prix La Marseillaise cycle race. It was held on 29 January 2023 as a category 1.1 race on the 2023 UCI Europe Tour. The race started in Marseille and finished in Septèmes-les-Vallons.

Teams

UCI WorldTeams

 
 
 
 
 
 

UCI ProTeams

 
 
 
 
 
 
 
 
 

UCI Continental Teams

Result

References

2023 in French sport
2023 UCI Europe Tour
Grand Prix La Marseillaise
January 2023 sports events in France